Anar Din (also Romanized as Anār Dīn, Anār ed Dīn, and Anār od Dīn) is a village in Gahrbaran-e Shomali Rural District, Gahrbaran District, Miandorud County, Mazandaran Province, Iran. At the 2006 census, its population was 248, in 61 families.

References 

Populated places in Miandorud County